Margam Moors is a community of Neath Port Talbot county borough, Wales.  Together with the community of Margam, it forms the Margam electoral ward.

There were three inhabitants in Margam Moors at the 2001 census, and most of the area is open moorland with the central and northern areas occupied by Port Talbot Steelworks and Port Talbot Docks.  The south west of the community is Margam Sands beach.

Communities in Neath Port Talbot